Sangamam is a 1977 Indian Malayalam film, directed by Hariharan. The film stars Vincent, Sukumari, Jose, Bahadoor and Poojappura Ravi in the lead roles. The film has musical score by M. S. Viswanathan.

Cast
Vincent
Roja Ramani 
Jose 
Sukumari 
Bahadoor 
Poojappura Ravi

Soundtrack
The music was composed by M. S. Viswanathan and the lyrics were written by Mankombu Gopalakrishnan.

References

External links
 

1977 films
1970s Malayalam-language films
Films scored by M. S. Viswanathan
Films directed by Hariharan